The City of Wodonga is a local government area in the Hume region of Victoria, Australia, located in the north-east part of the state.

It is primarily urban with the vast majority of its population living in the Greater Wodonga urban area, while other significant settlements within the LGA include Bandiana and Bonegilla. Its floral and fauna emblems are pink heath and the Leadbeater's possum respectively—the same as those of the state of Victoria. It is one of only a few regional councils in Victoria to remain serving just one urban district after the amalgamation process of 1994, although through that process it did gained some portions of the former Shire of Chiltern and former Shire of Yackandandah.

The city is governed and administered by the Wodonga City Council; its seat of local government and administrative centre is located at the council headquarters in Wodonga. The city is named after the main urban settlement located in the north-east of the LGA, that is Wodonga, which is also the LGA's most populous urban centre with a population of 16,487. It provides governance for the Victorian part of the Albury-Wodonga urban area.

History
Wodonga was first surveyed in 1852 and proclaimed the town of Belvoir in the same year. In 1876 the Victorian colonial government granted a request from the people of the area for their district to be severed from the Shire of Yackandandah to form a new municipality, and on 10 March 1876, the Shire of Wodonga was incorporated. On 12 April 1911 it annexed a further part of Yackandandah, and on 30 March 1973, Wodonga was proclaimed a Rural City by the Governor of Victoria, Sir Rohan Delacombe.

The municipality survived widespread local government amalgamations in 1994, gaining the Baranduda and Barnawartha North districts from neighbouring shires. However, the councillors were dismissed on 18 November 1994, and replaced by commissioners Mel Read, a long-serving executive of the Albury-Wodonga Development Corporation, Des Kelly, a Shire of Tallangatta councillor from 1968 until 1994, and Mike Hansen, a retired army officer with management and logistics experience. The commissioners decided in 1995 that, to give the city a fresh image, the term "rural" be dropped from use except when legally required. It has since been officially renamed to the City of Wodonga. The elected council was reinstituted in 1997.

Council

Current composition
The current council is composed of seven councillors elected to represent an un-subdivided municipality. The current councillors were elected on 23 October 2020, and were announced 6 November 2020. On 23 November 2020, the councillors elected Kevin Poulton as Mayor for a one-year term, with a unanimous decision to have no Deputy Mayor.  In March 2022, Kat Bennett announced that she would be resigning from council, the vacancy was filled by a countback from the 2020 election, and Danny Lowe was elected to fill the position. In October 2022, John Watson tendered his resignation after being diagnosed with pancreatic cancer. A countback from the 2020 election was once again conducted, and Danny Chamberlain was elected. In December 2022, mayoral elections took place and the council elected new mayor, Ron Mildren.

Former Wards and Structure
Prior to 1994, Wodonga was composed of four wards and twelve councillors, with three councillors per ward elected to represent each of the following wards:
 Baranduda Ward
 Belvoir Ward
 Bonegilla Ward
 Greenhill Ward

The council was replaced with three commissioners on 18 November 1994, and at the 1997 inaugural elections of the new council, five councillors were elected to an unsubdivided municipality. Following the enactment of the Local Government (Democratic Reform) Act 2003 (Vic.), which amended the Local Government Act 1989, an independent review of Wodonga's internal structure was commissioned and advertised on 13 May 2004 by the Victorian Government. The final report by the Victorian Electoral Commission, issued on 27 September 2004, recommended that the council be increased in size to seven elected members, noting that at the time of the report, Wodonga was the only city council with fewer than seven, and that the task of representing the diversity and issues of a growing regional city was complex. It recommended leaving the City unsubdivided as it had a single, dominant centre and a small area.

The council was restructured accordingly and elections held on 26 November 2005 returned seven councillors with Rodney Wangman as mayor and Brian Wicks as deputy mayor.
Elections in late November 2008 resulted in four of the sitting seven councillors losing their seats, and saw the City of Wodonga gain a new Mayor and Deputy-Mayor, Crs Mark Byatt and Angela Collins respectively.

Administration and governance
The council meets in the council chambers at the council headquarters in the Wodonga Municipal Offices, which is also the location of the council's administrative activities. It also provides customer services at its administrative centre in Wodonga.

Townships and localities
The 2021 census, the city had a population of 43,253 up from 39,351 in the 2016 census

^ - Territory divided with another LGA

Population

* Estimate in 1958 Victorian Year Book.

See also
 List of localities (Victoria)
 List of places on the Victorian Heritage Register in the City of Wodonga

References

External links
 Wodonga City Council official website
Metlink local public transport map
Link to Land Victoria interactive maps

Local government areas of Victoria (Australia)
Hume (region)